The Down Senior Football Championship is an annual Gaelic football competition contested by top-tier Down GAA clubs. The Down County Board of the Gaelic Athletic Association has organised it since 1903.

Kilcoo are the title holders (2022) defeating Warrenpoint in the Final.

History
Since the turn of the Millennium, the competition and Down football has largely been dominated by the "Big Three", with 21 of the 23 titles being shared by Kilcoo (11 titles), Mayobridge (7) and Burren (St Mary's) (3). Clonduff in 2000 and Bryansford in 2003 are the only other 2 teams to win a senior championship this century.

Honours
The trophy presented to the winners is the Frank O'Hare Cup. The winners of the Down Senior Championship qualify to represent their county in the Ulster Senior Club Football Championship. The winners can, in turn, go on to play in the All-Ireland Senior Club Football Championship.

Finals listed by year
(r) = replay

Notes
† The 1934 replay was abandoned. Castlewellan were awarded the title.

Winners and runners-up listed by club

References

 
Down GAA club championships
Senior Gaelic football county championships